The Chin State Cultural Museum is a museum that display bronze-wares, silverwares, traditional dresses, household utensils made by bamboo, clay-pipes, musical instruments, weapons of the ethnic Chin people and located at Bogyoke Road, Hakha, Chin State, Myanmar.

References

Museums in Myanmar
Chin State
Museums established in 1990